Central Valley Fuego FC, also known as CV Fuego FC or simply Fuego FC, is an American professional soccer team based in Fresno, California. The team was founded in 2020, and played its inaugural season in 2022. The team competes in USL League One, the third tier of the US soccer league system and plays its home matches at Fresno State Soccer Stadium.

History

Foundation 
Central Valley Fuego FC became the twelfth professional club in California and the only one in Fresno after Fresno FC withdrew from USL Championship in 2019, the club was announced on December 8, 2020 and the logo was unveiled on January 21, 2021. The team's name is a nod to the former Fresno Fuego that played in USL League Two from 2003 to 2019.

Colors and crest 
Fuego colors are black and red. The club's logo is based on a shield shaped like the head of a spade, representing the agricultural laborers of California's Central Valley. Across the top of this shield is the name of the team, while below lie three diagonal stripes of black-green-black which represent agriculture and growth. In base are red flames which represent the team's name and the passion for soccer of the local population.

Players and staff

Roster

Current staff

Record

Year-by-year

1. Top Scorer includes statistics from league matches only.

Head coaches
 Includes USL Regular Season, USL Playoffs, U.S. Open Cup. Excludes friendlies.

See also 
 USL League One
 Soccer in the United States

References

External links 
 

Sports in Fresno, California
Soccer clubs in California
2020 establishments in California
USL League One teams
Central Valley Fuego FC
Association football clubs established in 2020